Adam Bartoš (born 27 April 1992) is a Czech male volleyball player. He is part of the Czech Republic men's national volleyball team. On club level he plays for Tours VB.

References

External links
 Profile at FIVB.org
 

1992 births
Living people
Czech men's volleyball players
Sportspeople from Zlín
Expatriate volleyball players in Poland
Tours Volley-Ball players